James Brian Gordon Hastings (born 12 May 1938) is a British musician associated with the Canterbury scene who plays saxophones, flute and clarinet.

Hastings was born in Aberdeen, Scotland.  He has played with his brother Pye Hastings in Caravan, with Soft Machine, Hatfield and the North, National Health, Bryan Ferry, Trapeze, Chris Squire, among others. He played alto saxophone, clarinet and flute with Humphrey Lyttelton's eight-piece jazz band. With the other members of the Lyttelton band, he performed on the 2001 Radiohead album Amnesiac.

Discography
John Horler & Jimmy Hastings
Point of Intersection (1986)

Caravan
Caravan (1968)
If I Could Do It All Over Again, I'd Do It All Over You (1970)
In the Land of Grey and Pink (1971)
Waterloo Lily (1972)
For Girls Who Grow Plump in the Night (1973)
Caravan and the New Symphonia (1974)
Cunning Stunts (1975)
Blind Dog at St. Dunstans (1976)
The Battle of Hastings (1995)

Hatfield and the North
The Rotters' Club (1975)

National Health
National Health (1977)
Of Queues and Cures (1978)

Soft Machine
Third (1970)
Fourth (1971)

Todd Dillingham
The Wilde Canterbury Dream (1992)

Trapeze
You Are the Music...We're Just the Band (1972)
The Final Swing (1974)

References

External links
Official website, at jimmyhastings.co.uk
Calligraph Records

1938 births
Living people
People from Aberdeen
Musicians from Aberdeen
Scottish jazz saxophonists
British male saxophonists
Soft Machine members
Canterbury scene
Caravan (band) members
Scottish jazz flautists
Scottish jazz clarinetists
Mirage (British band) members
21st-century saxophonists
21st-century clarinetists
21st-century British male musicians
British male jazz musicians
21st-century flautists